José Roberto Figueroa Padilla, also known as Macho, (15 December 1959 – 24 May 2020) was a Honduran footballer who played as a forward, in Honduras for F.C. Motagua, C.D.S. Vida and in Spain for Real Murcia and Hércules CF. He also represented Honduras at the 1982 FIFA World Cup.

Club career
Macho Figueroa was a forward. One of his best technical movements was a powerful shot. After a great participation with Honduras in the 1982 FIFA World Cup, his services were acquired by Real Murcia of the Spanish Second Division. By dint of goals, Figueroa contributed to his team when it returned to La Liga. His league debut was against Real Sociedad where he had a good afternoon scoring two goals. He scored eleven goals in each of the two seasons he played in La Liga. A hat trick against CD Málaga on the third day of the 1984–85 season earned him the position of top scorer in the category. Over time, Macho with his goals became one of the most important players in the history of Real Murcia.

He finished his career at the team where he started his professional career, C.D.S. Vida, after a stint in Costa Rica with C.S. Cartaginés.

International career
Figueroa made his debut for Honduras in 1980 and earned at least 28 caps, scoring 14 goals. He has represented his country in 19 FIFA World Cup qualification matches and was part of the 1982 FIFA World Cup squad in Spain, where he played all 3 matches.

International goals
Scores and results list Honduras' goal tally first.

Managerial career
In October 2012, he was named sporting director of Honduran Second Division side Real Sociedad after he lived in the US for 14 years.

Death

Figueroa died on 24 May, 2020, in San Francisco, California, after going into cardiac arrest.

References

External links
 
 Acciones de jugadores hondureños – Nación 

1959 births
2020 deaths
People from Yoro Department
Association football forwards
Honduran footballers
Honduras international footballers
1982 FIFA World Cup players
C.D.S. Vida players
Real Murcia players
Hércules CF players
F.C. Motagua players
C.S. Cartaginés players
Liga Nacional de Fútbol Profesional de Honduras players
La Liga players
Honduran expatriate footballers
Expatriate footballers in Spain
Honduran expatriate sportspeople in Spain
Expatriate footballers in Costa Rica
Honduran expatriate sportspeople in Costa Rica
CONCACAF Championship-winning players